Anders Hammer Strømman (born 1975) is a professor of industrial ecology in the Industrial Ecology Programme at the Norwegian University of Science and Technology (NTNU). He has collaborated with Francesco Cherubini in developing a method to analyse the climate impact of  emissions from biomass combustion, and his fields of expertise include life cycle studies of producing electric car batteries.

Strømman co-authored the fifth assessment report of the UN Intergovernmental Panel on Climate Change (IPCC). He is also a co-author in Working Group III of the sixth assessment report: Climate Change 2022: «Mitigation of Climate Change».

In 2011, he received the Laudise Medal from The International Society for Industrial Ecology (ISIE) in recognition of his research. «The Laudise Medal is awarded for outstanding achievements in industrial ecology by a researcher under the age of 36.»

He is elected member of the Norwegian Academy of Technological Sciences (NTVA).

Publications 
 

  (The Norwegian Scientific Index)

References

External links 
 
  NTNU Open is the institutional repository of the Norwegian University of Science and Technology

Academic staff of the Norwegian University of Science and Technology
1975 births
Living people
Members of the Norwegian Academy of Technological Sciences